The Garibaldi School (formerly Garibaldi College) is a co-educational secondary school and sixth form built in the 1960s. It is situated near to the edge Clipstone village, Nottinghamshire (part of Newark and Sherwood District Council administrative area) but lies within Mansfield District Council's Newlands electoral ward and teaches young people from Clipstone and the Forest Town area of Mansfield. It provides pupils from 11-16 with a GCSE education and 16 to 18 year-olds with an advanced GCE or VCE education through their sixth form.

History
The school was founded in the 1960s and was named for the Italian leader Giuseppe Garibaldi. 

Garibaldi Comprehensive School was by the 1980s suffering from a poor reputation. In 1989 a new headmaster, Bob Salisbury, was appointed who put in place a programme of improvements that lasted five years. The school removed levels of management and marketed itself. The school was able to attract new funding and the head was recognised for his skills as an entrepreneur. The head noted that the success came from not investing in one-off initiatives but in activities that continued from year to year. Salisbury was known for his 'bobbing cork' analogy. He believed his staff should progress like a cork along a stream, knowing that they were free to speed up, slow down or try a different route. Bob Salisbury was given a knighthood in 1998 in recognition of his work in Education.

A 2009 Ofsted Inspection of the Design and Technology department found that overall their education was "good". An earlier inspection of the whole school in 2008 rated the school as "good" overall.

In March 2013, Ofsted rated Garibaldi as a "good" school, with some aspects of "outstanding" teaching. In August 2013, Garibaldi received some of the best GCSE and A-Level results the school has ever seen, and topped the league tables, ranking as one of the best schools in Nottinghamshire. The college was also ranked within the top 25 schools across the nation.

Investments
With help from the governments specialist status scheme, it was  a specialist computing and mathematics college from 2003 until 2012 when it lost its specialism. The college then became known simply called 'Garibaldi College' instead of 'Garibaldi Maths and Computing College'. Locally known as 'Gara', the words "Pride, Respect and Achieve" are now the school's key words.

In 2010 the school was identified as part of a rebuilding programme. The council noted that the older buildings were costly to maintain and it was intended to rebuild them but keep the newer buildings like the sports hall, however, the long overdue rebuild was cancelled and all plans were scrapped

References

External links
 Garibaldi School website

Secondary schools in Nottinghamshire
Academies in Nottinghamshire